FIBS may refer to:
 Fibonacci numbers
 Finnish International Baccalaureate Society
 First Internet Backgammon Server

See also 
 Fib (disambiguation)